The city of Puruándiro is in the north of the Mexican state of Michoacán. 
The population is 70,571. It was founded by Juan de Villaseñor y Orozco in 1522.

The wooded main garden has a kiosk that indicates that it was founded in 1565, but no records to corroborate that.

It is believed that Miguel Hidalgo y Costilla spent a night in Puruándiro during his revolutionary movement and that in 1965 President Gustavo Díaz Ordaz paid a visit to commemorate its founding. But again, there is a lack of information to support these facts.

Near the church and the center portals are the "Lázaro Cárdenas" and the "Morelos" garden. The latter holds a bust dedicated to José María Morelos, an insurgent soldier in the Mexican war of independence. In addition to a second effigy commemorating Benito Juárez, former president of the nation.

The "Los Arcos" thermal waters spa is one of the most notable tourist attractions in town.

Name
Its name purépecha is Purhuandirhu which means "place of water where the fire rests" or "place of hot water" since the city enjoys abundant hot water that comes from the mantles surrounding aquifers. Many people take advantage of this water (which is rich in minerals such as sulfur) to bathe, wash clothes or simply relax by soaking in it.

Demography 
The city of Puruándiro has a population of 32,333 inhabitants according to data from the XIV General Population and Housing Census from 2020 which has been done by the National Institute of Statistics and Geography. That makes it the 16th most populous city in Michoacán

Religion 
Christianity Catholic predominates in 97% of the population, followed to a lesser extent by Protestant, Jehovah's Witnesses and atheism.

Ethnic groups 
According to the 1990 General Population and Housing Census, 213 people who speak Purépecha live in the municipality, of whom 106 are men and 107 are women.

External links
http://www.michoacan.gob.mx/municipios/73puruandiro.htm Government Puruándiro

Populated places in Michoacán